The Tennis Federation of Kosovo (/ ) is a governing body of tennis in Kosovo.

History
Tennis Federation of Kosovo was established in 1996 in Peja. Kosovo became the 50th member of Tennis Europe on 28 March 2015.

Tennis clubs in Kosovo 
The Tennis Federation of Kosovo currently oversees eleven tennis clubs.
There are some clubs like K.T. Prishtina (Prishtine), K.T. Rilindja (Prishtine), K.T. Sporek ([Gjakove]), K.T.DielliX (Prishtine), K.T. Prizreni, K.T. Trepça (Mitrovice), K.T. Drenica (Skenderaj), K.T. Rahoveci (Rahovec), K.T. 99 (Gjilan), K.T. Peja, K.T. Gracanica

References

External links
 Official website 

Sports governing bodies in Kosovo
Kosovo
Tennis in Kosovo
1990s establishments in Kosovo